Patrick Keane (born July 19, 1997) is a Canadian rower from Victoria, British Columbia. Keane competes in the lightweight double sculls event.

Career
Keane has competed at three World Championships. Keane finished in 13th in 2017 with partner Taylor Hardy and then 15th and 9th respectively at the 2018 and 2019 editions.  

In May 2021, Keane and partner Maxwell Lattimer qualified the singles sculls boat for Canada's 2020 Olympic team, by winning the 2021 FISA Final Qualification Regatta in Lucerne, Switzerland.

References

1997 births
Canadian male rowers
Living people
Rowers from Victoria, British Columbia
Rowers at the 2020 Summer Olympics